Hansis is a surname. Notable people with the surname include:

Ron Hansis (born 1952), American ice hockey player
Van Hansis (born 1981), American actor